Andrej Aćin is a Serbian director, screenwriter and composer from Belgrade. In the 1990s, he fronted the gothic rock band BAAL. From 1992 until 1995, he worked as the music editor at the Belgrade Art television station, and, in 1997, he was enrolled at the Belgrade Art Academy on the department for film and television directing. He directed the theatre piece Pasija po telu (Passion on the Body), a semi-documentary Moj svet pun svetlosti (My World Full of Light) and the short movie Margina (Margin). In 2005, he appeared in the movie Bye Bye Blackbird, directed by Robinson Savary.

Career as musician

BAAL
Having worked as an ambiental music composer, in 1989, Aćin founded the gothic rock band BAAL, as its keyboardist and lead vocalist, with bass guitarist Srđa Popović, guitarist Vojkan Petković, and drummer Vlada Marinković. The band released their debut album Između božanstva i ništavila (Between Divinity and Nothingness) in 1992. The album, recorded at the Cacadu studio in April 1992, featured guest appearances by Mizar vocalist Goran Tanevski, on the track "Talas" ("The Wave"), Ekatarina Velika, frontman Milan Mladenović, guitar on the title track, Van Gogh frontman Zvonimir Đukić, guitar on the track "Pad" ("The Fall"), and Ekatarina Velika drummer Marko Milivojević, on the track "Iščezavam" ("I Am Fading Away"). Having released the album, the band performed regularly until 1995, when they decided to stop working together.

Retro Deux
After the disbandment of BAAL, Aćin worked on the material intended to be released on the second BAAL album, released in 1996 by Image Records on the EP Artoodeeto, featuring seven tracks and released under the name Retro Deux. The release, produced by the dance music producer Srđan Babović, featured the lyrics in Serbian, French, and English language. Beside the vocal duties, Aćin played the keyboard and programing parts, while guest appearances featured guitarists Duda Petrović and Nebojša Marić and percussionist Aleksandar Milanović. Promotional video was recorded for the track "Run". The band appeared on the hip hop band WHO Is The BEST album Play, released by CentroScena in 1998, on the track "Još jedan dim" ("Yet Another Smoke"). The previous year, the track appeared on the various artists compilation Time Out, released by Komuna

Solo career
In early 1998, Aćin collaborated with the French group Noir Désir, performing live as well as working on the remix CD One Trip, One Noise  with his mixes of the tracks "Fin de siecle (G.L.Y.O)" and "Septembre en attendent (un jour a Belgrade)".

For the Milan Konjević's movie Waiting (For Death), Aćin recorded two instrumental tracks, "Waiting 1" and "Waiting 2". In 1995, he recorded music for the omnibus movie Paket aranžman, directed by Srđan Golubović. During the same year he also worked on the soundtrack of the Slepi kolosek. He composed for three Dejan Zečević's movies, Kupi mi Eliota, released in 1997, T.T. Syndrome, released in 2000, and Mala noćna muzika, released in 2002. In 2001, the music he recorded for the Absolute 100 was released officially by Komuna, and, the following year, KunstKraft officially released the T.T. Syndrome original soundtrack. In between movie soundtracks, he also composed for the theater piece Silvija, directed by Milica Kralj at the Atelje 212.

Awards
 1995 - Golden Mimosa at the Herceg Novi Yugoslav Film Festival for the best original movie soundtrack for the movie Paket aranžman.
 1998 - Golden Arena at the Novi Sad film festival for the movie Kupi mi Eliota.
 2000 - Special Mention for the artistic creation and quality at the Media Dance International Festival in Paris for the movie North-West Coast.
 2001 - Gold Award of Belgrade for the creation, 48. Yugoslav Festival of Short and Documentary Film, Belgrade for the movie North-West Coast
 2001 - Second Prize at the Balkan Youth Festival in Thessaloniki, Greece for the movie Shopping!
 2002 - Composer of the year Golden Mimosa award at the Herceg Novi Film Festival for the movie Absolute 100.
 2002 - Gold Award of Belgrade for the creation of The World Belongs to You the World Belongs to Us documentary at the 49. Yugoslav Festival of Short and Documentary Film.
 2003 - Special Golden Jury award at the WorldFest-Houston International Film Festival for the short movie Margina.
 2005 - Nominated for the best director at the Budapest DISCOP festival for the movie Jelena.

Discography

With BAAL
 Između božanstva i ništavila (1992)

With Retro Deux
 Artoodeeto (EP, 1996)
 "Još jedan dim" (single recorded with WHO Is The BEST, 1997, 1998)

With Noir Désir
 One Trip, One Noise (1998)

With Sfumato
 Sfumatology (1999)

With Frederic Ashton Jr.
 Frederic Ashton Jr. (2009)

Solo works
 Apsolutnih sto (original soundtrack 2001)
 T.T. Sindrom (original soundtrack 2002)

References

 EX YU ROCK enciklopedija 1960–2006, Janjatović Petar; 
 Discography at the official site
 Biography at the official site
 Filmography at the official site

1972 births
Living people
Musicians from Belgrade
Serbian rock singers
Serbian rock keyboardists
Serbian composers
Serbian record producers
Serbian film directors
Serbian theatre directors
20th-century Serbian male singers
Theatre people from Belgrade